The 2004 World Long Distance Mountain Running Challenge was the first edition of the global Mountain running competition, World Long Distance Mountain Running Championships, organised by the World Mountain Running Association.

Results

Men individual

Women individual

References

External links
 

World Long Distance Mountain Running Championships
World Long Distance Mountain Running